Grinnell Regional Airport , known locally as Billy Robinson Field, is a city-owned public-use airport located one mile (1.6 km) south of the central business district of Grinnell, a city in Poweshiek County, Iowa, United States. It is included in the National Plan of Integrated Airport Systems for 2017–2021, which categorized it as a local general aviation facility.

Although most U.S. airports use the same three-letter location identifier for the FAA and IATA, this airport is assigned GGI by the FAA but has no designation from the IATA.

Facilities and aircraft 
Grinnell Regional Airport covers an area of 115 acres (46.5 ha) at an elevation of 1008 feet (307 m) above mean sea level. It has one runway: 13/31 is 5,200 by 75 feet (1,585 x 23 m) with a grooved concrete surface, it also has approved precision instrument approaches.

For the 12-month period ending September 27, 2016, the airport had 5,950 aircraft operations: all general aviation.
In December 2017, there were 14 aircraft based at this airport: 13 single-engine and 1 multi-engine.

See also
List of airports in Iowa

References

External links 
 Airport page at City of Grinnell website
 Grinnell Regional Airport from the Iowa DOT Aviation System Plane
 

Airports in Iowa
Transportation buildings and structures in Poweshiek County, Iowa